The following is a list of Japanese actresses in surname alphabetical order. Names are displayed given name first, per Wikipedia manual of style.

To be included in this list, the person must have a Wikipedia article showing that they are Japanese actresses or must have references showing that they are Japanese actresses and are notable.

A
Haruka Abe
Nagisa Abe
Natsumi Abe
Rika Adachi
Yumi Adachi
Saki Aibu
Shoko Aida
Yuzuki Aikawa
Rina Aizawa
Kyoko Aizome
Sayaka Akimoto
Tsubasa Akimoto
Yoko Akino
Rio Akisada
Kumiko Akiyoshi
Yūki Amami
Chisato Amate
Eiko Ando
Sakura Andō
Yū Aoi
Wakana Aoi
Mayuko Aoki
Tsuru Aoki
Yuko Araki
Yui Aragaki
Michiyo Aratama
Narimi Arimori
Kasumi Arimura
Momoka Ariyasu
Nao Asahi
Mayumi Asaka
Nana Asakawa
Aiko Asano
Atsuko Asano
Yūko Asano
Ruriko Asaoka
Kumiko Asō
Yumi Asō
Chikage Awashima
Haruka Ayase

B
Fumika Baba
Chieko Baisho
Mitsuko Baisho

C
Catalina Yue
Chara
Chiaki (Fujimoto Chiaki)
Reiko Chiba

D
Rei Dan

E
Kanako Enomoto
Makiko Esumi

F
Rie Fu
Yuko Fueki
Sumiko Fuji
Takako Fuji
Mina Fujii
Miho Fujima
Mizuki Fukumura
Shiho Fujimura
Yumiko Fujita
Ayako Fujitani
Miki Fujitani
Miwako Fujitani
Norika Fujiwara
Kyoko Fukada
Mayuko Fukuda
Eri Fukatsu
Kazue Fukiishi
Mayuko Fukuda
Mutsumi Fukuma
Rila Fukushima
Haruka Fukuhara
Seika Furuhata

G
Ayame Goriki
Kumiko Goto
Maki Goto

H
Michiko Hada
Chisaki Hama
Mie Hama
Minami Hamabe
Ayumi Hamasaki
Rumi Hanai
Sachie Hara
Setsuko Hara
Tomoyo Harada
Haru 
Kyōko Hasegawa
Ai Hashimoto
Kanna Hashimoto
Manami Hashimoto
Reika Hashimoto
Yoshie Hayasaka
Hiroko Hayashi
Akari Hayami
Riona Hazuki
Emiri Henmi
Mari Henmi
Manami Higa
Noriko Higashide
Ryōko Hirosue
Alice Hirose
Suzu Hirose
Aika Hirota
Ikumi Hisamatsu
Yuriko Hishimi
Tae Hitoto
Miyu Honda
Tsubasa Honda
Maki Horikita
Mari Hoshino
Tomoko Hoshino
Naomi Hosokawa
Akane Hotta
Mayu Hotta

I
Yui Ichikawa
Hiroe Igeta
Riho Iida
Haruna Iikubo
Marie Iitoyo
Elaiza Ikeda
Kimiko Ikegami
Chizuru Ikewaki
Rina Ikoma
Shizuka Inoh (Annie Yi)
Mio Imada
Harumi Inoue
Mao Inoue
Takako Irie
Noriko Iriyama
Ayumi Ishida
Hikari Ishida
Yuriko Ishida
Anna Ishibashi
Shizuka Ishibashi
Satomi Ishihara
Mako Ishino
Yōko Ishino
Ayumi Ito
Maiko Ito
Misaki Ito
Risako Itō
Sairi Ito 
Yoshimi Iwasaki
Shima Iwashita
Rika Izumi

J
Miki Jinbo
Risa Junna

K
Kaho
Mugi Kadowaki
Meiko Kaji
Shihori Kanjiya
Bunko Kanazawa
Miho Kanno
Yumi Kaoru
Yu Kashii
Nagisa Katahira
Erika Karata
Ai Kato
Natsuki Kato
Moka Kamishiraishi
Mone Kamishiraishi 
Atsuko Kawada
Haruna Kawaguchi
Ami Kawai
Yuumi Kawai
Miwako Kakei
Rina Kawaei
Umika Kawashima
Asuka Kawazu
Maiko Kazama
Naoko Ken
Rinko Kikuchi
Rei Kikukawa
Fumino Kimura 
Komako Kimura
Tae Kimura
Yoshino Kimura
Asuka Kishi
Keiko Kishi
Yukino Kishii
Kayoko Kishimoto
Mirei Kiritani
Kie Kitano
Keiko Kitagawa
Kaya Kiyohara
Mao Kobayashi
Satomi Kobayashi
Kyōko Koizumi
Fujiko Kojima
Ayaka Komatsu
Nana Komatsu
Arisa Komiya
Hiroko Konishi
Manami Konishi
Miho Konishi
Sakurako Konishi
Mahiru Konno
Misako Konno
Fuka Koshiba
Koyuki
Ayano Kudo
Haruka Kudo
Mio Kudo
Risa Kudo
Yuki Kudoh
Ryoko Kuninaka
Makiko Kuno
Komaki Kurihara
Sumiko Kurishima
Chiaki Kuriyama
Yuina Kuroshima
Fukumi Kuroda
Hitomi Kuroki
Haru Kuroki
Meisa Kuroki
Reina Kurosaki
Tomoka Kurotani
Tetsuko Kuroyanagi
Koharu Kusumi
Shioli Kutsuna
Machiko Kyō
Yui Koike

M
Erika Mabuchi
Yōko Maki
Aju Makita
Erina Mano
Takako Matsu
Sumire Matsubara
Airi Matsui
Rena Matsui
Ruka Matsuda
Mayu Matsuoka
Nanako Matsushima
Moeko Matsushita
Nao Matsushita 
Yuki Matsushita
Yoko Matsuyama
Wakana Matsumoto
Keiko Matsuzaka
Maki Meguro
Sayumi Michishige
Junko Mihara
Mimura
Sara Minami
Yoko Minamino
Hiroko Mita
Sumiko Mizukubo
Karen Miyama
Nobuko Miyamoto
Yume Miyamoto
Junko Miyashita
Sakura Miyawaki
Aoi Miyazaki
Rie Miyazawa
Ayaka Miyoshi 
Maki Mizuno
Miki Mizuno
Kaori Momoi
Kanako Momota
Akiko Monou
Kanna Mori
Mitsuko Mori
Nana Mori
Naoko Mori
Yoko Moriguchi
Shigeru Muroi
Ai Moritaka
Suzuka Morita
Aoi Morikawa

N
Anzu Nagai
Masami Nagasawa
Mei Nagano
Anna Nagata
Midori Naka
Riisa Naka
Anna Nakagawa
Yukie Nakama
Anne Nakamura
Saemi Nakamura
Tamao Nakamura
Ayami Nakajo
Kumiko Nakano
Ryoko Nakano
Miki Nakatani
Miho Nakayama
Shinobu Nakayama
Amuro Namie
Kuriko Namino
Mari Natsuki
Yōko Natsuki
Masako Natsume
Mito Natsume
Nanao
Toshie Negishi
Risa Niigaki
Fumi Nikaido
Yuki Ninagawa
Naomi Nishida
Mineko Nishikawa
Akiko Nishina
Nanase Nishino
Mariya Nishiuchi
Yōko Nogiwa
Yuka Nomura
Maho Nonami
Rena Nōnen
Chise Nakamura
Meru Nukumi

O
Noriko Ogawa
Kaori Oguri
Megumi Ōhara
Reiko Ohara
Sakurako Ohara
Suzuka Ohgo
Ito Ohno
Hikaru Ohsawa
Ayumi Oka
Mariko Okada
Natsumi Okamoto 
Yukiko Okamoto
Megumi Okina
Makoto Okunaka
Kazusa Okuyama
Aya Omasa
Yuko Oshima
Ichika Osaki
Itsumi Osawa
Chihiro Otsuka
Sayuri Oyamada

P
Jenny Pat (Jenny Murata)

R
Riria
Ryo

S
Irie Saaya
Hinako Saeki
Yuki Saito
Akane Sakanoue
Rikako Sakata
Hiyori Sakurada
Nanami Sakuraba
Hinako Sakurai
Ayaka Sasaki
Hinako Sano
Hiroko Sato
Oka Satomi
Yasuko Sawaguchi
Miyuu Sawai
Erika Sawajiri
Miyuki Sawashiro
Megumi Seki
Nana Seino 
Asaka Seto
Kou Shibasaki
Kyoka Shibata
Kotono Shibuya
Momoko Shibuya
Mirai Shida
Yuumi Shida
Eihi Shiina
Shiho
Haruka Shimazaki
Fumika Shimizu
Misa Shimizu
Mariko Shinoda
Kavka Shishido
Yui Sakuma
Yua Shinkawa
Yume Shinjo
Ryoko Shinohara
Tomoe Shinohara
Mari Shirato
Miki Sugimoto
Hana Sugisaki 
Anne Suzuki
Keiko Suzuka
Mayo Suzukaze
Honami Suzuki
Kyōka Suzuki

T
Yuna Taira
Tomoko Tabata
Mikako Tabe
Yukari Tachibana
Honami Tajima
Kaho Takada
Riho Takada
Miho Takagi
Saya Takagi
Reni Takagi
Ai Takahashi
Hitomi Takahashi
Hikaru Takahashi
Kaori Takahashi
Keiko Takahashi
Rin Takanashi
Maryjun Takahashi
Atsuko Takahata
Mitsuki Takahata
Hideko Takamine
Fubuki Takane
Shiho Takano
Reiko Takashima
Mayuko Takata
Rena Takeda
Rina Takeda
Keiko Takeshita
Yūko Takeuchi
Yukari Taki
Miori Takimoto
Sara Takatsuki
Emi Takei
Haruka Tateishi
Shiori Tamai
Tina Tamashiro
Chie Tanaka
Eri Tanaka
Kinuyo Tanaka
Misako Tanaka
Reina Tanaka
Yoshiko Tanaka
Naomi Tani
Noriko Tatsumi
Erika Toda
Keiko Toda
Yukiko Todoroki
Rie Tomosaka
Reina Triendl
Tsugumi
Tao Tsuchiya
Noa Tsurushima
Mayu Tsuruta

U
Rio Uchida
Yuki Uchida
Rina Uchiyama
Takako Uehara
Juri Ueno
Aya Ueto
Miyoshi Umeki

W
Akiko Wakabayashi
Mayumi Wakamura
Ayako Wakao
Isako Washio
Eriko Watanabe
Natsuna Watanabe
Noriko Watanabe

Y
Akiko Yada
Alissa Yagi
Honoka Yahagi
Hiroko Yakushimaru
Anna Yamada
Isuzu Yamada
Yu Yamada
Miyako Yamaguchi
Momoe Yamaguchi
Tomoko Yamaguchi
Rio Yamashita
Fujiko Yamamoto
Azusa Yamamoto
Hikaru Yamamoto
Maika Yamamoto
Mayumi Yamamoto
Mirai Yamamoto
Mizuki Yamamoto
Natsuko Yamamoto
Kasumi Yamaya
Momiji Yamamura
Hirona Yamazaki 
Miki Yanagi
Narumi Yasuda
Kimiko Yo
Ryoko Yonekura
Soo Yong
Sayuri Yoshinaga
Riho Yoshioka
Miyu Yoshimoto 
Yuriko Yoshitaka
Kyoko Yoshine
Ai Yoshikawa
Mio Yūki

Z
Naomi Zaizen

See also
 List of Japanese actors

List
Japanese actresses
Actresses
Lists of Japanese women
Japanese